The 2004–05 Welsh Alliance League is the 21st season of the Welsh Alliance League, which is in the third level of the Welsh football pyramid.

The league consists of sixteen teams and concluded with Bodedern Athletic as champions and promoted to the Cymru Alliance. Bottom team, Y Felinheli were relegated to the Gwynedd League.

Teams
Rhyl Reserves were champions in the previous season, Llandyrnog United finished runners-up and were promoted to the Cymru Alliance. They were replaced by Gwynedd League champions Llanrwst United.

Grounds and locations

League table

References

External links
Welsh Alliance League

Welsh Alliance League seasons
3
Wales